The Farasan Islands are a small group of coral islands approximately 40 km off the coast of Jizan in the Red Sea, belonging to Saudi Arabia.

The government provides free ferry rides twice a day to Farasan Islands from Jizan Port. The largest island of the archipelago is Farasan Island; others include Sajid Island and Zufaf Island. The islands are a popular tourist destination. In recent years the Saudi government has tried to increase the tourism quality and worth (as part of a larger tourism drive in the country) of the Islands in order to attract even more visitors.

History
In the 1st century AD, the islands were known as Portus Ferresanus. A Latin inscription dating from 144 AD  has been found on the island which attests to the construction of a Roman garrison. It is believed that the islands may have been attached to the province of Arabia Felix, before being transferred to Aegyptus some time before 144 AD. If this is correct, it would make the Farasan Islands the farthest Roman outpost, being nearly 4000 km from Rome itself.

In 1900, the Imperial German Navy struck a deal with the Ottoman Empire that allowed them to establish a coaling station on the islands to support their ships operating in the Red Sea. The German Empire planned on eventually acquiring the islands but the project was dropped in 1902 because the coal depot remained unused and the Ottoman Empire refused to transfer it.

Climate
The climate in the Farasan archipelago is characterised by a long hot season (April–October) and a short mild one (November–March). In the long dry period high temperatures are usually dominant. The mean annual temperature is 30 C. Furthermore, the mean relative humidity in winter ranges from 70% to 80% and in summer between 65% and 78%. The highest rainfall occurs in April and the precipitation is generally unpredictable in the southern part of Red Sea.

Nature

The Farasan Island Marine Sanctuary is a protected area. It is home to the Arabian gazelle, and, in winter, migratory birds from Europe. Oceanic animals include manta rays, whale sharks, and several species of sea turtles including endangered and critically endangered green and hawksbill turtles, dugongs, and several species of dolphins and whales with occasional visits by others such as orcas.

Economy
After a French engineer investigated petroleum seeps on the islands in 1912, a 75-year concession was granted to the Red Sea oilfields. At the time, the Farasan Islands supported a small fishing industry.

Tourism and fishing also play a role in the economy. Farasan Island is connected to Jezan port by ferry.

See also

 Greater Yemen

References

External links

 Saudi Aramco World: Dreaming of Farasan
 Farasan Island, a diver's paradise , Splendid Arabia: A travel site with photos and routes



Archipelagoes of the Indian Ocean
Islands of the Red Sea
Islands of Saudi Arabia
Jizan Province
Protected areas of Jazan Region